Yoshiaki Yatsu (谷津嘉章 Yatsu Yoshiaki, born July 19, 1956) is a Japanese professional wrestler, amateur wrestler and mixed martial artist. He is known for being one-half of the first-ever All Japan Pro Wrestling World Tag Team Champions with Jumbo Tsuruta, having won the NWA International Tag Team Championship and the PWF Tag Team Championship, and unifying the two titles.

Amateur wrestling career

1976 Summer Olympics
At the age of 20, Yatsu competed in freestyle wrestling at the 1976 Summer Olympics in Montreal. He did not place in the tournament.

1980 Summer Olympics
He would have participated in the 1980 Summer Olympics in Moscow, but Japan chose to follow the American-led boycott.

Controversial IOC Banishment
In 1986 Yatsu took a hiatus from professional wrestling in order to one last time chase his Olympic dream. However, after winning a Japanese National Championship in the super heavyweight division in 1986 and while training for the 1987 Asian Wrestling Championships, the International Olympic Committee declared that Yatsu was a professional athlete and banned him from not only that competition, but also from the 1988 Summer Olympics. The decision stunned many people, but Yatsu didn't file an appeal.

Professional wrestling career
In 1980, after Japan decided not to send their athletes to take part in the Summer Olympics in Moscow, Yoshi "The Yak" Yatsu garnered a great deal of national attention, when he announced his intention of becoming a professional wrestler. Yatsu worked for the World Wrestling Federation as the Great Yatsu from 1980 to 1981. Within just a few years, Yatsu became a regular headliner for New Japan Pro-Wrestling (NJPW), before joining Riki Choshu, when he left the promotion for All Japan Pro Wrestling (AJPW) at the end of 1984. In All Japan Yatsu and Choshu formed a tag team, which would go on to win the NWA International Tag Team Championship.

While Yatsu was training for his Olympic dream, Choshu left All Japan and returned to New Japan. Upon his return to professional wrestling, Yatsu decided not to join his tag team partner in New Japan, but to stay in All Japan. Afterwards, All Japan broke up the tag team of Genichiro Tenryu and Jumbo Tsuruta and made Tsuruta Yatsu's new tag team partner. The tag team, known as "The Olympics", would go on to win the World Tag Team Championship five times, the PWF World Tag Team Championship once and in 1987 the team also won the World's Strongest Tag Determination League. In 1990 the team broke up when Yatsu jumped to Super World of Sports. In 1991, while working for the promotion, Yatsu unsuccessfully challenged Hulk Hogan for the WWF Championship. When Super World of Sports folded in 1992, Yatsu formed his own promotion Social Pro Wrestling Federation (SPWF), but would wrestle himself only semi-regularly. In 1994 he returned to New Japan to take part in the G1 Climax tournament.

In recent years, Yatsu has been the president of a transportation company. On November 30, 2010, he returned to the professional wrestling ring to wrestle his retirement match. The match took place in front of 500 fans at Shinjuku Face in Tokyo, and saw Yatsu and Koji Ishinriki losing to Tatsumi Fujinami and Tiger Mask, when Yatsu submitted to Fujinami.

In September 2015, Yatsu came out of retirement to team with his son Teriyaki Yatsu and began competing for smaller promotions. In April 2019, he debuted for Dramatic Dream Team (DDT).

In 2021, nearly 2 years since he had his right leg amputated he returned to the ring as part of the 15-person gauntlet battle royal match at CyberFight's CyberFight Festival 2021.

Mixed martial arts career
After spending multiple years out of the spotlight, Yatsu, aged 44, received a big money offer to fight for mixed martial arts promotion Pride Fighting Championships. On October 31, 2000, Yatsu faced Gary Goodridge in Osaka. Yatsu, who hadn't had any stand-up training at all and hadn't competed outside of professional wrestling in 13 years, was defeated at 8:58 in the first round. Despite being dominated, Yatsu received a standing ovation from the crowd due to the amount of damage he absorbed without quitting, even trying a leglock at a point. The two were booked in a rematch on September 24, 2001. Goodridge again dominated the fight, got Yatsu in a guillotine choke and asked for his corner to throw in the towel, which they did.

In December 2015, he became a supervisor for DEEP.

Personal life
In 1991, at the age of 35, Yatsu was diagnosed with diabetes. On June 25, 2019, Yatsu underwent an operation to amputate his right leg below the knee, as bacteria had entered his bloodstream and his right toe was progressively necrotic.

Championships and accomplishments

Amateur wrestling
1976 Japanese Olympic Trials - First place, 198 pounds
1978 Asian Games - First place, super heavyweight
1979 Asian Wrestling Championships - First place, 220 pounds
1979 Japanese National Championships - First place, super heavyweight
1980 Japanese Olympic Trials - First place, 220 pounds
1986 Japanese National Championships - First place, super heavyweight

Professional wrestling
All Japan Pro Wrestling
NWA International Tag Team Championship (1 time) – with Riki Choshu
PWF World Tag Team Championship (1 time) – with Jumbo Tsuruta
World Tag Team Championship (5 times) – with Jumbo Tsuruta
World's Strongest Tag Determination League (1987) – with Jumbo Tsuruta
January 2nd Korakuen Hall Heavyweight Battle Royal (1990)
DDT Pro-Wrestling
KO-D 8-Man Tag Team Championship (1 time) – with Akito, Hiroshi Yamato and Keigo Nakamura
International Wrestling Promotion
IWA World Tag Team Championship (1 time) – with Goro Tsurumi
Pro Wrestling Illustrated
Ranked No. 291 of the top 500 singles wrestlers of the "PWI Years" in 2003
Ranked No. 17, and 31 of the 100 best tag team of the "PWI Years" with Riki Choshu and Jumbo Tsuruta, respectively, in 2003
Super World of Sports
SWS Tag Team Championship (2 times) – with Haku
Tokyo Sports
Best Tag Team Award (1989) – with Jumbo Tsuruta
Outstanding Performance Award (1986)
World Class Championship Wrestling
WCCW Television Championship (1 time)

Mixed martial arts record

| Loss 
| align=center| 0-2
| Gary Goodridge 
| TKO (corner stoppage)
| Pride 16 
|  
| align=center| 1 
| align=center| 3:03
| Osaka, Japan 
|
|- 
| Loss 
| align=center| 0-1 
| Gary Goodridge 
| TKO (punches) 
| Pride 11 - Battle of the Rising Sun
|  
| align=center| 1 
| align=center| 8:58 
| Osaka, Japan 
|

Submission grappling record
KO PUNCHES
|- style="text-align:center; background:#f0f0f0;"
| style="border-style:none none solid solid; "|Result
| style="border-style:none none solid solid; "|Opponent
| style="border-style:none none solid solid; "|Method
| style="border-style:none none solid solid; "|Event
| style="border-style:none none solid solid; "|Date
| style="border-style:none none solid solid; "|Round
| style="border-style:none none solid solid; "|Time
| style="border-style:none none solid solid; "|Notes
|-
|Loss|| Ricco Rodriguez || Points || ADCC 2001 +99 kg|| 2001|| || ||
|-

References

External links
 
 
 

1956 births
Living people
Japanese male sport wrestlers
Japanese male professional wrestlers
Japanese male mixed martial artists
Mixed martial artists utilizing freestyle wrestling
Olympic wrestlers of Japan
Wrestlers at the 1976 Summer Olympics
Asian Games medalists in wrestling
Asian Games gold medalists for Japan
Wrestlers at the 1978 Asian Games
Medalists at the 1978 Asian Games
20th-century Japanese people
21st-century Japanese people
20th-century professional wrestlers
21st-century professional wrestlers
World Tag Team Champions (AJPW)
KO-D 8-Man/10-Man Tag Team Champions
NWA International Tag Team Champions
PWF World Tag Team Champions